Kandi Assembly constituency is an assembly constituency in Murshidabad district in the Indian state of West Bengal.

Overview
As per orders of the Delimitation Commission, No. 68 Kandi Assembly constituency  covers Kandi municipality, Kandi community development block, and Satui Chaurigachha gram panchayat of Berhampore community development block.

Kandi Assembly constituency is part of No. 10 Baharampur (Lok Sabha constituency).

Members of Legislative Assembly

Election results

2011
In the 2011 election, Apurba Sarkar of Congress defeated his nearest rival Ainal Haque of CPI.

 

Sahitya Pradip Sinha, contesting as an independent, was reportedly backed by Trinamool Congress.

.# Swing calculated on Congress+Rebel Congress (Independent) vote percentages taken together in 2006. Calculated only on the vote percentages secured by Apurba Sarakar in 2006 and 2011 the swing is +3.59%.

2006
In the 2006 election, Apurba Sarkar of Congress MP of Baharampur, Adhir Ranjan Chowdhury Supported Independent defeated his nearest rival Abdul Hamid of CPI.

1977–2006
In the 2006 state assembly elections Apurba Sarkar, Independent, won the 68 Kandi assembly seat defeating his nearest rival Abdul Hamid of CPI. Apurba Sarkar, contesting as an independent, was a rebel congress candidate put up by Adhir Choudhury as a protest against the official Congress candidate Atish Sinha. He was subsequently taken back into the Congress. Contests in most years were multi cornered but only winners and runners are being mentioned. Atish Chandra Sinha of Congress defeated Chandan Sen of CPI in 2001, Syed Wahid Reza of CPI in 1996 and 1991. Syed Wahid Reza of CPI defeated Bankim Trivedi of Congress in 1987. Atish Chandra Sinha of Congress defeated Syed Abdur Razzaque of CPI in 1982 and Jagadish Sinha of Janata Party in 1977.

1951–1972
Atish Chandra Sinha won in 1972 and 1971. Kumar Jagadish Chandra Sinha, Independent, won in 1969. G. Trivedi of Congress won in 1967. Kumar Jagadish Chandra Sinha of Congress won in 1962. Kandi was a joint seat in 1957. Sudhir Mondal and Bimal Chandra Sinha, both of Congress, won the seat jointly. In independent India's first election in 1951 Goalbadan Trivedi of Congress won from the Kandi seat.

References

Assembly constituencies of West Bengal
Politics of Murshidabad district